David Banquet, born 22 July 1974 in Libourne, is a French rugby union player who plays as right prop for RC Toulonnais (1.80 m, 122 kg).

Career 
 Libourne
 Mérignac
 1992-1999 : AS Béziers
 1999-2001 : US Dax
 2001-2002 : AS Béziers
 2002-2003 : CA Bègles-Bordeaux
 2003 : USA Limoges
 2003-2004 : RC Narbonne
 2004-2006 : US Montauban
 Since 2006 : RC Toulon

Honours 
 Pro D2 Champions : 2006 with Montauban, 2008 with Toulon

External links 
  Player profile at lequipe.fr
  Statistics at itsrugby.fr
 

French rugby union players
Rugby union props
People from Libourne
1974 births
RC Toulonnais players
Living people
Sportspeople from Gironde
AS Béziers Hérault players
US Dax players
US Montauban players
CA Bordeaux-Bègles Gironde players
RC Narbonne players